Zapolice may refer to the following places:
Zapolice, Radomsko County in Łódź Voivodeship (central Poland)
Zapolice, Zduńska Wola County in Łódź Voivodeship (central Poland)
Zapolice, West Pomeranian Voivodeship (north-west Poland)